The 2010 Montreal Alouettes season was the 44th season for the team in the Canadian Football League and their 56th overall. The Alouettes won their seventh Grey Cup championship, 21–18 against the Saskatchewan Roughriders, becoming the first team to repeat as Grey Cup champions since the 1997 Toronto Argonauts.

Offseason

CFL draft

Preseason 

 Games played with colour uniforms.

Regular season

Season standings

Season schedule 

 Games played with colour uniforms.
 Games played with white uniforms.
 Games played with alternate uniforms.
 Games played with alternate uniforms.
 Games played with retro uniforms.

Roster

Coaching staff

Awards and records

2010 CFL All-Stars

CFL Eastern All-Stars
 QB – Anthony Calvillo, CFL Eastern All-Star
 WR – Jamel Richardson, CFL Eastern All-Star
 OT – Josh Bourke, CFL Eastern All-Star
 OG – Scott Flory, CFL Eastern All-Star
 DE – John Bowman, CFL Eastern All-Star
 LB – Chip Cox, CFL Eastern All-Star
 CB – Mark Estelle, CFL Eastern All-Star
 DB – Jerald Brown, CFL Eastern All-Star
 K – Damon Duval, CFL Eastern All-Star

Milestones
On October 11, in the Alouettes home game against Calgary, Ben Cahoon became the CFL's all-time leader in pass receptions, surpassing Terry Vaughn's previous record of 1,006.

Playoffs

Schedule

 Games played with colour uniforms.
 Games played with white uniforms.

Bracket

East Final

98th Grey Cup Final

References

Montreal Alouettes seasons
Montreal Alouettes Season, 2010
Grey Cup championship seasons